Geoff Simkins (born 13 October 1948) is a British jazz musician who plays alto saxophone.

Career
Simkins started playing jazz in his early teens. His first instrument was drums, but he quickly changed to the alto saxophone. He turned professional in 1977.

His early work included time with the Harry Strutters Hot Rhythm Orchestra and the Temperance Seven, but his principal stylistic influences have been the American alto player Lee Konitz and tenor player Warne Marsh.

Geoff has played at concerts, clubs and festivals in all parts of the UK, in Europe and beyond. He often works with American musicians who are visiting the UK, and over the years this list has grown to include Art Farmer, Bobby Shew, Al Cohn, Tal Farlow, Slide Hampton, Warren Vache, Al Grey, Kenny Davern, Bill Berry, Al Casey, Howard Alden, Ruby Braff, Bill Coleman and Conte Candoli.  He has recorded with UK tenor player Danny Moss and with US trumpeters Billy Butterfield and Yank Lawson. Since the 1980s he has worked regularly with UK guitarist Dave Cliff.

Geoff is also a respected teacher, and as well as running improvisation courses in Brighton, UK, he has been a regular tutor at the famous Glamorgan Jazz Summer School in Wales (now discontinued, but later held at Trinity College of Music in London and, from 2012, at the Royal Welsh College of Music and Drama in Cardiff). In 1994 he was invited to be a tutor at the Czech Jazz Summer School and appeared at clubs in Prague and on Czech Television.

Selected recordings
with Nikki Iles, piano
Don't Ask

with Dave Cliff
The Right Time (LP)
West Coast Blues (MC)
Sipping At Bells (CD)
The Music of Tadd Dameron (CD)
Conversation (CD)

with Allan Ganley and Dave Cliff
Live at the Station

with Howard Alden
Howard Alden's UK4 Live@Lewes

Sources
 John Chilton, Who's Who of British Jazz, Cassell, London 1997

External links
 Info about Simkins

1948 births
Living people
British jazz alto saxophonists
British male saxophonists
21st-century saxophonists
21st-century British male musicians
British male jazz musicians